Gilchrist Junior/Senior High School is a public high school in Gilchrist, Oregon, United States.

Academics
In 2008, 81% of the school's seniors received a high school diploma. Of 26 students, 21 graduated, three dropped out, and two were still in high school the following year.

References

High schools in Klamath County, Oregon
Public middle schools in Oregon
Education in Klamath County, Oregon
Public high schools in Oregon